Reski is a surname. Notable people with this surname include:

 Heiko Reski (born 1963), German long jumper
 Petra Reski (born 1958), German journalist
 Ralf Reski (born 1958), German biologist

See also